Růžena Grebeníčková (1 November 1925 – 21 July 1997) was a leading Czech literary historian and theorist, and translator.

She was married to the philosopher Karel Kosík with whom she had three children, Antonín (1952), Irena and Štěpán.

Work 
Růžena Grebeníčková, List of records

References
Databases of the National Library CR - Authority Record: Grebeníčková, Růžena, 1925-1997

1925 births
1997 deaths
Czech literary historians
Herder Prize recipients
Czech translators
20th-century translators